The 2020 West Alabama Tigers football team represented the University of West Alabama as a member of the Gulf South Conference (GSC) during the 2020 NCAA Division II football season. They were led by seventh-year head coach Brett Gilliland. The Tigers played their home games at Tiger Stadium in Livingston, Alabama.

Fall season delayed
On August 12, 2020, Gulf South Conference postponed fall competition for several sports due to the COVID-19 pandemic. A few months later in November, the conference announced that there will be no spring conference competition in football. Teams that opt-in to compete would have to schedule on their own.

At the beginning of January 2021, the Tigers program announced their first opponent of the spring competition, Savannah State for the Gulf Coast Challenge. In late February, the program announced their second opponent, Limestone.

Schedule

References

West Alabama
West Alabama Tigers football seasons
College football undefeated seasons
West Alabama Tigers football